Eurorail can refer to:

Eurail, a company that sells passes and tickets for European railroads
Eurorails, a popular variation of the Empire Builder board game
Privatbanen Sønderjylland, a defunct Danish railway company also known as "EuroRail"